When the Boat Comes In is a British television period drama produced by the BBC between 1976 and 1981. The series stars James Bolam as Jack Ford, a First World War veteran who returns to his poverty-stricken (fictional) town of Gallowshield in the North East of England. The series dramatises the interwar political struggles of the 1920s and 1930s and explores the impact of national and international politics upon Ford and the people around him.

Production 
The majority of episodes were written by creator James Mitchell, but in series 1 north-eastern writers Tom Hadaway, Sid Chaplin and Alex Glasgow contributed episodes, and in series 3 Jeremy Burnham and Colin Morris shared writing duties with Mitchell. Mitchell also wrote three tie-in books to the T.V. show; When the Boat Comes In, When the Boat Comes In: The Hungry Years and When the Boat Comes In: Upwards and Onwards. The final book brings the reader up to date with the end of the second series of the TV show.

The traditional tune "When The Boat Comes In" was adapted by David Fanshawe and sung by Alex Glasgow for the title theme of the series. Fanshawe also composed the incidental music. The BBC revived the series in 1981, with the fourth series telling the story of Jack Ford as he returns to Britain penniless, after six years spent bootlegging in the United States of America, and follows him as he sets up in London.

Series
Series 1: 8 January to 1 April 1976 (13 50 min episodes)
Series 2: 29 October 1976 to 4 February 1977 (13 50 min episodes)
Series 3: 8 September to 15 December 1977 (15 50 min episodes)
Series 4: 17 February to 21 April 1981 (10 50 min episodes)

Regular cast
James Bolam as Jack Ford (1976–77,81 / Series 1-4 / 48 episodes)
James Garbutt as Bill Seaton (1976–77 / Series 1-3 / 39 episodes)
Jean Heywood as Bella Seaton (1976–77 / Series 1-3 / 39 episodes)
John Nightingale as Tom Seaton (1976–77 / Series 1-3 / 39 episodes)
Edward Wilson as Billy Seaton (1976–77, 81 / Series 1-4 / 35 episodes)
Malcolm Terris as Matt Headley (1976–77 / Series 1-3 / 34 episodes)
Susan Jameson as Jessie Ashton née Seaton (1976–77, 81 / Series 1-4 / 30 episodes)
Madelaine Newton as Dolly (1976–77 / Series 1-3 / 30 episodes)
Basil Henson as Sir Horatio Manners (1976–77 / Series 1-3 / 25 episodes)
Geoffrey Rose as Arthur Ashton (1976–77 / Series 1-3 / 18 episodes)
Rosalind Bailey as Sarah Headley née Lytton (1977, 81 / Series 2-4 / 23 episodes)
William Fox as the Duke of Bedlington (1976–77 / Series 2-3 / 13 episodes)
Lois Baxter as Lady Caroline No. 2 (1977, 81 / Series 3-4 / 15 episodes)

Semi-regular cast
Michelle Newell as Mary Seaton née Routledge (1976 / Series 1 / 6 episodes)
Noel O'Connell as Young Tommy (1976–77 / Series 2-3 / 6 episodes)
Catherine Terris as Miss Laidlaw (1976–77 / Series 2-3 / 7 episodes)
Vernon Drake as Hotel Porter (1976–77 / Series 2-3 / 7 episodes)
Isla Blair as Lady Caroline No. 1 (1976–77 / Series 2 / 5 episodes)
Roger Avon as Stan Liddell (1977, 81 / Series 2-4 / 5 episodes)
Ian Cullen as Geordie Watson (1977, 81 / Series 2-4 / 4 episodes)
Bobby Pattinson as Eddy Morton (1976–77 / Series 2-3 / 4 episodes)
Patrick O'Connell as Dr Stoker (1976–77 / Series 2-3 / 3 episodes)
Ralph Michael as Father Courtnay (1976–77 / Series 2-3 / 3 episodes)
Sheri Shepstone as Nellie (1976–77 / Series 2-3 / 3 episodes)
John Malcolm as Poskett (1976–77 / Series 2-3 / 3 episodes)
Martin Duncan as Roddy (1977 / Series 2-3 / 3 episodes)
David Lawton as Tovey No. 1 (1976–77 / Series 2 / 3 episodes)
John Kidd as Tovey No. 2 (1977 / Series 3/ 5 episodes)
Christopher Benjamin as Channing (1977 / Series 3/ 3 episodes)
Colin Douglas as John Ryder (1977 / Series 3/ 3 episodes)
Murray Hayne as Norman Hodges (1977 / Series 3/ 3 episodes)
Peter McGowan as Len Laidlaw (1977 / Series 3/ 3 episodes)
Christine Anderson as Rosie Mason (1977 / Series 3/ 3 episodes)
W. Morgan Sheppard as Robert Joseph Dixon (1977 / Series 3/ 3 episodes)
Mary Larkin as Isobel Murcheson (1977 / Series 3/ 3 episodes)
Joby Blanshard as Milburn (1977 / Series 3 / 3 episodes)
Judy Loe as Tania Corley (1981 / Series 4 / 3 episodes)

Series One (1976)

Series Two (1976–77)

Series Three (1977)

Series Four (1981)

DVD releases
All four series are available on DVD in the UK.

Further reading

External links
 

1976 British television series debuts
1981 British television series endings
1970s British drama television series
1980s British drama television series
BBC television dramas
Television shows set in Tyne and Wear
Television shows set in Newcastle upon Tyne
Television series set in the 1920s
Television series set in the 1930s
Poverty in England
English-language television shows